Relatively Speaking is an American TV game show that aired in syndication from September 5, 1988, to June 23, 1989.

The series was hosted by comedian John Byner, with John Harlan announcing. The object of the game was for four celebrities to identify a famous person who is related to an in-studio contestant.

Playing on Byner's comedic skills, before each day's first game began, a video clip was shown of Byner impersonating a famous character (e.g., Indiana Jones) or person while explaining the rules of the game.

Gameplay

First Rounds
In the first two (later three) rounds, the celebrity panel asked yes or no questions to the contestant. The panelist in control kept asking questions until receiving a "no" (similar to What's My Line? and the later series Figure it Out).

The contestant won a growing prize package for each "no". If the panel received eight "no" answers, they were stumped and the contestant won a grand prize package (dubbed the "Super Stumper Jackpot").

Final Round (Celebrity Round)
In the final round of the day, the final contestant appeared along with another celebrity guest with his/her children, all of whom were hidden away from the panel. The contestant still won an accumulating prize package. Regardless if the panel was stumped or named the celebrity relative, the celebrity's winnings were donated to charity.

References

External link
Relatively Speaking on IMDb

American panel games
1980s American game shows
1988 American television series debuts
1989 American television series endings
First-run syndicated television programs in the United States